is the ninth single by the Japanese band Deen.  It is used as the first ending song for the anime series Dragon Ball GT. It was released on Mini CD on April 1, 1996, in Japan only and peaked at number 3 on the Oricon chart. It is coupled with the song "Sunday". The song was used for the first 26 episodes of the series.

An instrumental version of the song was used in the credits of the Blue Water dub of Dragon Ball GT.

Track listing
All songs were written by Shuichi Ikemori
Hitori ja Nai(ひとりじゃない)
composer: Tetsurō Oda/arranger: Hirohito Furui
Nichiyoubi(日曜日)
composer: Shuichi Ikemori/arranger: Daisuke Ikeda
Hitori ja Nai(ひとりじゃない) (Karaoke)
Nichiyoubi(日曜日) (Karaoke)

References 

1996 singles
Songs written by Tetsurō Oda
Dragon Ball songs
1996 songs